The High Court Division, Supreme Court of Bangladesh  popularly known as the 'High Court' is one of the two divisions of the Supreme Court of Bangladesh, the other division being the Appellate Division.  It consists of the Chief Justice of Bangladesh and the Judges of the High Court Division.

The High Court Division exercises both original jurisdiction and appellate jurisdiction in civil and criminal matters. The prime jurisdiction of it is the Writ Jurisdiction, pursuant to which it is empowered under article 102 of the Constitution of Bangladesh to issue writ of certiorari, mandamus, quo warranto, prohibition and habeas corpus.

History

Dhaka High Court (1947 - 1955)

The High Court of judicature for East Bengal commonly known as the Dhaka High Court was established in 1947 under Pakistan (Provisional Constitutional) Order 1947 as a separate High Court with all Appellate, Civil and Original jurisdictions.

East Pakistan High Court (1955 - 1971)
In 1955 the Dhaka High Court became the High Court of East Pakistan and the Supreme Court of Pakistan was established as the apex Court with the appellate jurisdiction to hear the decisions of the High Courts established in the East and West Pakistan.

Until 1967 the High Court was held in the building that now known as the Old High Court Building on Kazi Nazrul Islam Avenue, opposite the curzon hall, Dhaka. With the construction of a larger facility in the 1960s nearby that now houses the Supreme Court of Bangladesh and Attorney General's office, the High Court was shifted from Old House on 10 July 1967.

Chief Justices (1947 - 1971)
 Justice Abu Saleh Muhammad Akram (1947 - 1950)
 Justice Muhammad Shahabuddin (1950-1953)
 Justice Amiruddin Ahmad (1954-1956)
 Justice Amin Ahmed (1956 - 1959)
 Justice M. A. Ispahani (1959-1962)
 Justice Imam Hossain Choudhury (1962-1964)
 Justice Syed Mahbub Murshed (1964-1967)
 Justice Badruddin Ahmed Siddiky (1967-1971)

Division of the Supreme Court (1971 - present)
In 1971 East Pakistan became the independent Republic of Bangladesh. On 9 January 1972, Bangladesh enacted the Supreme Court of Judicature Act to regularize the judicial system. The Act declared that the Supreme Court of Bangladesh consisted of the Appellate Division and the High Court Division. The High Court Division replaced the Dhaka High Court and Supreme Court of Pakistan was preceded by the Appellate Division.

Jurisdiction

Original Jurisdiction
The High Court Division can hear a case or suit as Court of first instance.

Appellate Jurisdiction
Any law may confer appellate jurisdiction on any matter. For example, CrPC and CPC have conferred on the HCD appellate jurisdiction.

Revisional Jurisdiction

Review Jurisdiction

Superintendence and Control over Subordinaten Courts

Transfer of cases from subordinate Courts

Sitting Permanent Judges of the High Court Division
As of July 2022 the list of permanent judges are as follows:
Madame Justice Salma Masud Chowdhury
Justice Muhammad Abdul Hafiz
Justice Dr. Syed Refaat Ahmed
Justice A. K. M. Asaduzzaman
Justice Zubayer Rahman Chowdhury
Justice Md. Emdadul Huq
Justice Md. Rais Uddin
Justice Md. Emdadul Haque Azad
Justice Md. Ataur Rahman Khan
Justice Syed Md. Ziaul Karim
Justice Md. Rezaul Haque
Justice Sheikh Abdul Awal
Justice S. M. Emdadul Hoque
Justice Mamnoon Rahman
Madame Justice Farah Mahbub
Madame Justice Naima Haydar
Justice Md. Rezaul Hasan
Justice A. N. M. Bashir Ullah
Justice Abdur Rob
Justice Dr. Quazi Reza-Ul Hoque
Justice A. K. M. Zahirul Hoque
Justice Sheikh Md. Zakir Hossain
Justice Md. Habibul Gani
Justice Gobinda Chandra Tagore
Justice Sheikh Hassan Arif
Justice J. B. M. Hassan
Justice Md. Ruhul Quddus
Justice Md. Khasruzzaman
Justice Farid Ahmed
Justice Md. Nazrul Islam Talukder
Justice M Akram Hossain Chowdhury
Justice M Ashraful Kamal
Justice K. M. Kamrul Kader
Justice Mohammad Mujibur Rahman Miah
Justice Mostofa Zaman Islam
Justice Mohammadullah
Justice Mohammad Khurshid Alam Sarker
Justice A K M Shahidul Haque
Justice Shahidul Karim
Justice Mohammad Jahangir Hossain
Justice Abu Taher Mohammad Saifur Rahman
Justice Ashish Ranjan Daash
Justice Mahmudul Haque
Justice Badruzzaman Badol
Justice Zafar Ahmed
Justice Kazi Md. Ejarul Haque Akondo
Justice Md. Shahinur Islam
Madame Justice Kashefa Hussain
Justice S.M. Mozibur Rahman
Justice Khizir Ahmed Choudhury
Justice Razik Al-Jalil
Justice Bhishmadev Chakrabortty
Justice Md. Iqbal Kabir
Justice Md. Salim
Justice Md. Sohrowardi
Justice Md. Abu Ahmed Jamadar
Justice A. S. M. Abdul Mobin
Justice Md Mostafizur Rahman
Madam Justice Fatema Najib
Justice Md. Kamrul Hossain Molla
Justice S. M. Kuddus Zaman
Justice Md. Atowar Rahman
Justice Khizir Hayat
Justice Shashanka Shekhar Sarkar
Justice Mohammad Ali
Justice Mohi Uddin Shamim
Justice Md. Riaz Uddin Khan
Justice M Khairul Alam
Justice S. M. Moniruzzaman
Justice Ahmed Sohel
Justice Sardar Mohammad Rashed Jahangir
Justice Khondaker Diliruzzaman
Justice K. M. Hafizul Alam
Justice Muhammad Mahbub-Ul-Islam
Justice Shahed Nuruddin
Justice Md Zakir Hossain
Justice Md Akhtaruzzaman
Justice Md Mahmud Hasan Talukder
Justice Kazi Ebadoth Hossain
Justice K. M. Zahid Sarwar
Justice A. K. M. Zahirul Haque
Madam Justice Kazi Zinat Hoque

References

Judiciary of Bangladesh
Law of Bangladesh